In the Court of the Crimson King is the first of the major box set releases from English progressive rock group King Crimson, released in 2010 by Discipline Global Mobile & Panegyric Records. The set features recordings from the band's initial lineup and the sessions for their 1969 debut album In the Court of the Crimson King, including several mixes of the album. Over 5 cds, 1 dvd, copious sleeve notes and replica memorabilia, In the Court of the Crimson King covers the genesis of King Crimson's birth.

Track listing

References

External links 

 

King Crimson albums
2010 albums
Discipline Global Mobile albums